WUB or Wub may refer to:
Water user board, a local association of water users
World University of Bangladesh
Washington University of Barbados
WUB Morning Vibes, a daily talk show in Belize
"Beyond Lies the Wub", a 1952 science fiction story by Philip K. Dick
A popular term for wobble bass in dubstep music